Nikolai Nikolaevich Baratov (February 1, 1865  – March 22, 1932) was an Imperial Russian Army general during World War I and the Russian Civil War.

Early career 
Baratov was born in Vladikavkaz, in the Terek Oblast of the Russian Empire. Although of ethnic Georgian descent (his real name was Baratashvili), he was also an ataman of the Terek Cossacks. He entered the military in 1882, and graduated from the Konstantinovskoe Artillery School and the  Saint Petersburg Military Engineering-Technical University (Nikolaevsky) in 1885. He was assigned to the 1st Sunzha-Vladikavkaz Regiment of the Terek Cossack Army and was promoted to sotnik in December of the same year.

In 1891 he graduated from the Nikolaev General Staff Academy with the rank of captain, and was assigned to serve in the Caucasus Military District. He commanded a squadron of dragoons from 1893–1894, and was assigned to the Stavropol Cossack Cadet School as an instructor from 1895-1897. He was promoted to colonel in the cavalry in July 1900. On March 29, 1901 he was made commander of the 1st Sunzha-Vladikavkaz Regiment, and was awarded  the Gold Sword of the Order of St. Anne for his actions in battle during the Russo-Japanese War. He became chief of staff of the Consolidated Cavalry Corps from August 1905 to March 1906, when he was promoted to major general. From July 1907, he served as Chief of Staff of the 2nd Caucasus Army Corps, and was promoted to lieutenant general on November 26, 1912.

First World War
After the outbreak of World War I, he headed the 1st Caucasus Cossack Corps on the Caucasus Front and was prominent at the Battle of Sarikamish. During the Persian Campaign Baratov was successful in defeating Kerim Pasha's rear troops on August 5, 1915 after the Battle of Kara Killisse. His task was to counter the pro-German forces in Persia (headed by Georg von Kanitz), and to link Russian forces with the British expeditionary forces in Persia. In October 1915, he landed at Bandar-e Anzali and by December 3, 1915, took the ancient Persian capital of Hamadan.  With the occupation of Qom and Kermanshah, the Russian forces under Baratov effectively isolated Persia from Ottoman Turkey, thus securing Persia for the Entente Powers. Baratov was decorated with the Order of St. George of the Fourth degree in October, 1916. After returning to Russia on March 24, 1917, he commanded the Caucasus Military District. On May 25, 1917 was appointed commander of the 5th Caucasus Army Corps. However, after the British defeat at the Siege of Kut, the Turks launched a massive offensive, forcing Baratov to return to Persia. He was made a general of cavalry on September 8, 1917.

Russian Civil War
After the October Revolution of 1917, Baratov disbanded his corps and lived in exile in British India for five months. During the Russian Civil War, he joined the White movement. In June 1919, General Denikin, leader of the anti-Soviet Volunteer Army and the Armed Forces of South Russia, sent Baratov to settle uneasy relations with Democratic Republic of Georgia, with the promise of security to Georgia's northern borders in reward for free passage of White Movement forces through Georgia. On September 13, 1919 Baratov was heavily wounded in a terrorist incident in Tiflis, resulting in the amputation of his leg. From March to April 1920 Baratov served as the Minister of Foreign Affairs of the South Russian government. After the final defeat of the White Movement in November 1920, he lived in exile in France, where he headed various Russian emigre organizations, notably the Union of Disabled Persons and the Overseas Union of Russian people with disabilities. He was buried at the Sainte-Geneviève-des-Bois Russian Cemetery.

Awards
Order of St. Stanislav Grade 3,  (1893)
Order of St. Anna Grade 3 (1895)
 Order of St. Stanislav Grade 2(1899)
 Order of St. Anne Grade 2 degree (1904)
 The golden gun "for courage" (1905)
 Swords of the Order of St. Anne Grade 2 (1906)
Order of St. Vladimir Grade 4, with swords and bow (1906)
 Order of St. Vladimir Grade 3 (6 December 1909)
 Order of St. Stanislav Grade 1 (6 December 1912)
 Order of St. George Grade 4 (15 October 1916) - for the successful operation in July 1915 in the Agridag mountain range .
 Grand Croix of the Légion d'honneur (1916)

References

1865 births
1932 deaths
People from Vladikavkaz
People from Terek Oblast
Georgian generals with the rank "General of the Cavalry" (Imperial Russia)
Georgian generals in the Imperial Russian Army
Russian untitled nobility
Imperial Russian Army generals
Russian military personnel of the Russo-Japanese War
Russian military personnel of World War I
White movement generals
Recipients of the Order of Saint Stanislaus (Russian), 1st class
Recipients of the Order of St. Anna, 2nd class
Grand Croix of the Légion d'honneur
Recipients of the Order of St. Vladimir, 3rd class
Russian amputees
Burials at Sainte-Geneviève-des-Bois Russian Cemetery
Emigrants from the Russian Empire to France